The 1977 municipal election was held October 19, 1977 to elect a mayor and twelve aldermen to sit on Edmonton City Council, nine trustees to sit on the public school board, and seven trustees to sit on the separate school board.

This was the first election in which a nine-member public school board was elected instead of the seven member board that had previously existed.  It was also the last election to use only four wards; beginning in 1980, two aldermen were elected from each of six wards.

Electoral system
Mayor was elected through First past the post.

Councillors were elected through Plurality block voting, three per ward, where each voter could cast up to three votes.

School board positions also were filled through Plurality block voting as well.

Voter turnout

There were 116,525 ballots cast out of 305,342 eligible voters, for a voter turnout of 38.2%.

Results

(bold indicates elected, italics indicate incumbent)

Mayor

(William Hawrelak had been elected mayor in the 1974 election, but had died in office.  Cavanagh was selected by council to replace him.)

Aldermen
Guide:
E.C.G.A = Edmonton Civic Government Association
E.V.A. = Edmonton Voters Association
U.R.G.E. = Urban Reform Group Edmonton

Public school trustees

Shirley Forbes - 38468
Mel Binder - 37438
Ernie Lund - 35406
Jim Patrick - 33618
Don Massey - 33444
Catherine Ford - 33170
Richard Jamieson - 32371
James Falconer - 31754
Elaine Jones - 27494
Lorne Mowers - 26792
Vernon Johnson - 25896
Douglas Sorenson - 24397
Molly Glass - 21330
John Mason - 16319
Clare Brown - 16252

Separate (Catholic) school trustees

Leo Floyd - 16438
Jean McDonald - 15123
Barry Cavanaugh - 11506
Phil Gibeau - 11207
Laurier Picard - 11071
Raymond Pinkowski - 10342
Joe Donahue - 9810
William McNeill - 8664
Zan Matishank - 8436
Patrick Murphy - 7873
Lyle Lavender - 7039
John Kash - 6506
Paul Haljan - 4659

References

External links

City of Edmonton: Edmonton Elections

1977
1977 elections in Canada
1977 in Alberta